Bartkus v. Illinois, 359 U.S. 121 (1959), is a decision of the U.S. Supreme Court. The decision held that coordination of federal officials with state officials did not implicate the double jeopardy Clause of the Fifth Amendment to the U.S. Constitution. It also held that a defendant may be acquitted of a federal crime and convicted of a state crime, even if those crimes share the same evidence, without violating the Due Process Clause of the Fourteenth Amendment.

The case established the dual sovereign exception to the Double Jeopardy Clause, enabling state and federal prosecutions for substantially similar events.

External links 

United States Supreme Court cases
United States Double Jeopardy Clause case law
1959 in United States case law
United States Supreme Court cases of the Warren Court